The Copa Latina was an international beach soccer tournament that took place annually in Brazil between 1998 and 2011 (save for 2007 and 2008). Four teams took part which were invitees from Latin Europe or Latin America (with the exception of 2003 participant Canada, which nevertheless has a substantial Latin sub-region). First played in Vitória, the competition rotated between several cities. After the knockout format of the inaugural tournament, all subsequent editions featured a round-robin format. 

Few nations won the tournament: Brazil dominated the event, winning nine titles; Chile, Portugal and Uruguay also won one title each.

Venues
The following is a table showing when and where the Copa Latina has been held:

Tournaments

Medal summary

References

External links 
 http://theroonba.com/beach98.htm

Beach soccer competitions
Recurring sporting events established in 1998